The United Nations Educational, Scientific and Cultural Organization (UNESCO) has designated 171 World Heritage Sites in Western Europe (including international dependencies). These sites are located in 9 countries (also called "state parties"); Germany and France are home to the most with 46 and 45, while Liechtenstein, Monaco and the British Crown Dependencies of the Isle of Man, Guernsey and Jersey have no sites. There are twelve sites which are shared between state parties both in and out of Western Europe. The first site from the region to be included on the list was the Aachen Cathedral in Germany in 1978, the year of the list's conception.

Each year, UNESCO's World Heritage Committee may inscribe new sites on the list, or delist sites that no longer meet the criteria. Selection is based on ten criteria: six for cultural heritage (i–vi) and four for natural heritage (vii–x). Some sites, designated "mixed sites," represent both cultural and natural heritage. In Western Europe, there are 151 cultural, 18 natural, and 2 mixed sites.

The World Heritage Committee may also specify that a site is endangered, citing "conditions which threaten the very characteristics for which a property was inscribed on the World Heritage List." Presently, none of the sites in Western Europe are currently listed as endangered, though two German sites and an English site were previously listed: the Cologne Cathedral was marked as endangered in 2004 due to the construction of several high-rise buildings around it, but it was removed from the list in 2006. The Dresden Elbe Valley site was listed in 2006 in hopes of halting the construction of the four lane Waldschlösschen Bridge through the valley. When construction continued as planned, it became the second site to be delisted as a World Heritage in 2009, the first being Oman's Arabian Oryx Sanctuary two years earlier. Liverpool Maritime Mercantile City was listed in 2004, marked as endangered in 2012 due to planned developments in the protected area, and removed from the list in 2021 when development plans went ahead.

List

Legend
The list below uses a cultural definition of Western Europe (which includes Ireland and the United Kingdom, contrary to the United Nations Statistics Division's definition). It also omits eight sites outside of Europe belonging to European state parties: Curaçao (Netherlands), French Austral Lands and Seas (France), French Polynesia (France), New Caledonia (France), Reunion Island (France), Gough Island (United Kingdom), Henderson Island (United Kingdom), and Bermuda (United Kingdom). These sites are included in the African, American, and Oceania lists.

Site – named after the World Heritage Committee's official designation
Location – sorted by country, followed by the region at the regional or provincial level and geocoordinates. In the case of multinational or multi-regional sites, the names are sorted alphabetically.
Criteria – as defined by the World Heritage Committee
Area – in hectares and acres, followed by buffer zones if applicable. A value of zero implies that no data has been published by UNESCO
Year – during which the site was inscribed to the World Heritage List
Description – brief information about the site, including reasons for qualifying as an endangered site, if applicable

World Heritage Sites

See also
 List of World Heritage Sites in Austria
 List of World Heritage Sites in Belgium
 List of World Heritage Sites in France
 List of World Heritage Sites in Germany
 List of World Heritage Sites in Luxembourg
 List of World Heritage Sites in the Netherlands
 List of World Heritage Sites in the Republic of Ireland
 List of World Heritage Sites in Switzerland
 List of World Heritage Sites of the United Kingdom

Notes

References

Europe
World Heritage Sites in Western Europe, List of